State Highway 2, abbreviated SH-2 or OK-2, is a designation for two distinct highways maintained by the U.S. state of Oklahoma. Though they were once connected, the middle section of highway was concurrent with three different U.S. highways, so the middle section was decommissioned for reasons of redundancy.

The southern section of highway runs from Antlers to U.S. Highway 64 near Warner, covering  through the southeastern part of the state. The northern SH-2 runs for  through Craig County in northeastern Oklahoma.

Route descriptions

Southern section

The southern section of SH-2 begins at SH-3 in Antlers. It travels north-northwest from here, roughly parallelling the Kiamichi River, until reaching Clayton and US-271. North of Clayton, Highway 2 and US-271 overlap for 3 miles (5 km). Immediately after this, SH-2 meets SH-43's eastern terminus southeast of Sardis Lake. SH-2 then crosses over the lake and meets SH-1/SH-63, and the three form a six-mile (10 km) concurrency. This area is mountainous and has some tight hairpin curves. After the concurrency Highway 2 continues northward, meeting US-270 at Wilburton.

SH-2 then passes Robbers Cave State Park and the eastern edge of the Sansbois Mountains before reaching SH-31 east of Quinton, and the two form a six-mile (10 km) concurrency until Kinta. Ten miles (16 km) north of here, Highway 2 meets SH-9. Three miles (4.9 km) later, the highway passes the eastern terminus of SH-71, south of the town of Porum, Oklahoma.  later, SH-2 meets US-266, which it will overlap until its end. After having an interchange at I-40 milemarker 278, both SH-2 and US-266 end at US-64 near Warner.

Northern section
The northern SH-2 begins at US-60/US-69 in Vinita. It then heads due north, meeting SH-25 four miles (6.5 km) west of Bluejacket. Six miles north of here, it comes to a junction with US-59 and SH-10 in Welch, Oklahoma.

All signage for SH-2 ends at US-59/SH-10 in Welch. However, the official definition of the highway contains an unsigned concurrency with US-59 to the point where it crosses the state line into Kansas.

History
The northern SH-2, between Vinita and the Kansas state line, was once part of US-73.

Until the early 1980s a portion of SH-2 was one of the last unpaved state highways in the Oklahoma road network.  The section between the communities of Kosoma, Oklahoma and Stanley, Oklahoma in the Kiamichi River Valley, remained gravel.  Its builders during the 1930s and 1940s, in order to save the expense of building two bridges across the Kiamichi River, routed the highway mid-way up the flank of Bull Creek Mountain.  The highway traversed the mountain at its midway point, with no shoulders or guard rails.  During the 1980s a new route was opened in the floor of the valley, featuring modern bridges across Pine Creek and the Kiamichi River.  The old route on Bull Creek Mountain was decommissioned and is no longer in use.

The old route from Clayton to Antlers (using Bull Creek Mountain) was known as Hwy 144. When the Route was renovated through the Valley (crossing the river in 2 places) and paved, the Route was renamed SH2.

The section of SH-2 between I-40 and SH-9 was pressed into service as a detour for eastbound I-40 traffic after the collapse of its bridge over the Arkansas River on May 26, 2002.

Junction list

Southern section

Northern section

References

External links

SH-2's southern section at OKHighways
SH-2's northern section at OKHighways

002
Transportation in Pushmataha County, Oklahoma
Transportation in Latimer County, Oklahoma
Transportation in Haskell County, Oklahoma
Transportation in Muskogee County, Oklahoma
Transportation in Craig County, Oklahoma